The game of Nain Jaune or Yellow Dwarf, also formerly called Lindor, is an "attractive and unique traditional French card game" using a board comprising five compartments or boxes. It is a reasoned game of chance because it combines the hazards of card distribution with the strategy of building suits. Nain Jaune, which is considered a classic French game, is named after the seven of diamonds, which is depicted as a yellow dwarf in the centre of the game board.

Nain Jaune first emerged in the mid-eighteenth century as one of the hocs group of games and is still a popular French family game today. The original rules were more challenging and the game could only be played by three or five players. By contrast, the modern rules are simple, the number of players is variable (3 to 8 players) and the game is suitable for old and young alike. It has been described as a "family game par excellence."

History 
The name goes back to a fairy tale, by French noblewoman, Baroness d'Aulnoy, published in 1698. Le Nain Jaune (the yellow dwarf) is a cruel story about an ugly, jealous and evil villain.

The game of Nain Jaune first appeared around 1760 in the French region of Lorraine under the name of jeu du Nain (Dwarf) or jeu du Nain-Bébé (Baby Dwarf). This name referred to Nicolas Ferry, nicknamed Baby, a dwarf, protected by Stanislas of Poland, Duke of Lorraine. It is related that Ferry became violent and cruel as he grew older and earned the nickname of "the yellow dwarf" after the villain in the fairy tale. The rules, first published in L'Avantcoureur in 1760, used the same general concept and layout as the modern game, but its rules varied in a number of points. The game spread throughout Europe and became popular until the French Revolution. At that time, in 1789, a French games compendium published rules for Nain Jaune – now also called Lindor – that were significantly different. These new, simpler rules have persisted until the present day.

Around 1850, the famous General Tom Thumb, attraction of the Barnum circus, revived interest in dwarves and at the same time interest in the game. The game fell into oblivion again after the days of the Second French Empire (1852–1870), but returned to fashion during the inter-war years. It has since become a classic French board game.

Gaming material 

Nain Jaune or Yellow Dwarf requires the following:
 a standard 52-card French pack;
 a game board with five compartments (often removable) or "boxes" representing, at the four corners, the 10, the J, the Q and the K; and, in the centre, the 7 or Nain Jaune ("Yellow Dwarf");
 jetons and/or fiches that can be of different colours, shapes and values (1, 5 and 10 points for example) equally distributed among the players at the beginning of the game to the value of 50–120 points each.

Nain Jaune or Yellow Dwarf - original rules 
The original rules for a game called Nain Jaune were published in two issues of L'Avantcoureur in 1760. These rules only allow three or five players and are more challenging, requiring cards to be built in suit sequences.

Overview 
Yellow Dwarf is a shedding game in which the aim is to be first to get rid of all your cards. The 1760 version was played by 3 or 5 players using a full French-suited pack and 5 additional cards – the K, Q, J, 10 and 7 or nain, the 'Dwarf' – which were placed face up on the table as a staking tableau. These are the 5 honours (belles cartes).

Cards 
Card are built in suit sequence, unlike modern Nain Jaune in which suits are irrelevant. Within each suit, cards rank in their natural order, from lowest to highest: One to King.  Certain cards were stops, i.e. they 'stop' the sequence, and are known as hocs. The three permanent hocs are the Q, the J and the 10. The 'Chief Hoc' (hoc principal) was the Dwarf, the 7, and the four Kings were 'end-of-run' hocs (hocs de fin de suite).

Dealing and play 
Dealing and play are anti-clockwise. If three play, dealer deals 15 cards, individually, to each. If five play, 9 cards are dealt to each player. The remaining 7 cards are placed face down to one side as a talon and are not used during the deal. Any card in the talon can act, in effect, as a 'stop' or 'incidental hoc''' (hoc accidentel), preventing sequences from being completed.

Eldest hand plays a card to the table to start the first run, calling out its name, e.g. "One" and may follow it by laying off the next higher card of the same suit if they have it e.g. "...Two". A player may keep on adding cards until unable to continue the sequence e.g. "...Three, Four and without (sans) Five". A player does not have to start with the lowest card. In turn, the other players continue to lay off as many cards as they can to the same suit sequence or say "pass" if unable. When a King is played to complete the run, the player calls "Hoc!" and may begin a new sequence with a card of any rank and suit. Equally if no player can continue a sequence because the wanted card is in the talon, the player of the last (highest) card in the existing sequence calls "Hoc!" and may start another sequence. The player of a permanent hoc does the same. If a player has the Chief Hoc, it is wild and may therefore be played at any time; equally it does not have to be played even if it is the next in sequence.

 Scoring 
Dealer antes 15 chips to the board as follows: 1 on the 10, 2 on the J, 3 on the Q, 4 on the K and 5 on the 7.

During the game, a player playing a hoc (i.e. a King or an honour) and announcing it receives 1 chip from each of the other players. A player playing an honour and announcing it wins the contents of the corresponding box as well. A player who forgets to announce a hoc, forfeits the stake that would have been won and it remains in situ.

The winner is the first player to go out having shed all his or her cards. The remaining players tot up their card points: courts being worth 10, Aces 1 and all other cards scoring their face value. The winner is paid by each player the number of chips corresponding to the card points of cards left in his or her hand. A player still holding the 7 at the end pays double. A player still holding an honour, is bête and has to double the stake in the corresponding box. If the winner managed to shed all cards without any of the other players being able to play at least one – this is an Opera – and the losers pay double.

Because only the dealer pays an ante, a game comprises a fixed number of rounds, typically 10 (5 players) or 12 (3 players).

 Lindor, Nain Jaune or Yellow Dwarf – modern rules 
Rules for the easier, modern version of the game were first published in 1789 under the name of "Lindor or Nain Jaune" and are still used today. They are also summarised on the website of the Academy of Forgotten Games (Academie des jeux oubliées).

 Overview 
The later game uses a bespoke board with five removable compartments or "boxes" decorated with imagery and the pictures of the 5 honour cards. In the centre is an image of a dwarf holding in his hand the 7 and, in each of the four corners, is depicted one of the other honours: the K, the Q, the J and the 10.

Key differences from the original game include:

 Any number of players from three to eight may play
 Suits are irrelevant and so there is no requirement to follow suit
 All players ante stakes to the board, and hence a game can comprise any number of deals 
 There are no permanent hocs nor a Chief Hoc There are no payments during the game except for the honours
 The payment system at the end of a deal is different
The game is less intricate and challenging and appears to have been designed to be speeded up with restrictions on the number of deals and players removed and the stakes greatly raised to increase its gambling potential.

 Preliminaries 
At the beginning of the game, each player is given the same number of chips (jetons) e.g. five 10-point chips, ten 5-point chips and twenty 1-point chips each. Then the board is 'dressed' in that each player places chips in the boxes on the board as follows: one chip on the 10, two chips on the J, three on the Q, four on the K and five on the 7 or 'Yellow Dwarf'. If there are any chips left from the previous round, they are kept and added to the new stakes.

The first dealer is chosen by lot. The dealer shuffles the cards, offers them to the left to be cut and then deals to the right, in threes, a number of cards dependent on the number of players as shown in the table below.

 Gameplay 
The game is played clockwise, so eldest hand, the player to the left of the dealer, starts. Eldest puts down any card of his choice, calling out its value e.g. "Five!", and continues with the next cards in sequence if able e.g. "Six, Seven, Eight...", regardless of suit. When a player stops he or she announces "no ... " or "without ... " (sans...). For example, to stop at nine a player announces "... no Ten!" (sans dix). The next player to the left continues the sequence if possible and if desired, and so on. If none of the players can complete the sequence, the player who has stopped starts a new sequence with any card.

When a player plays a King, that player starts a new sequence with any card held. A player placing one of the cards represented on the board, for example the Q, announces "the Queen who sweeps" (Dame qui prend) and sweeps up the chips in the box corresponding to the card. If a player forgets to announce this, the stake is lost and stays in place for the next game. A player still holding one of the honour cards at the end of the game, pays a bête to the board that matches what is in the box for that card.

The winner of the round is the player who is first to get rid of all his cards. The winner draws from the each other player either as many chips as that player has points left in his or her hand (each court card is worth 10, the rest count at face value). In counting points, pip cards are worth their face value, courts are worth 10 points each and Aces score 1 point each. A player who gets rid of all his cards at once when on lead for the first time makes an "Opera" (or Grand Opera) and, in addition to the payments from the other players, sweeps the board.

When the deal has been settled, the board is re-dressed for the next deal and the player to the right of the last dealer becomes the new dealer.

 Ending 
The game is over when a player is "ruined" and can no longer place 15 chips at the beginning of the round. Players may also choose a number of game turns or a game time; the winner is then the one with the most chips.

 See also 

 Pope Joan
 Pochen

 Footnotes 

 References 

 Literature 
 _ (1760) L'Avantcoureur, 27 October 1760, Issue 41 and 3 November 1760, Issue 42.
 d'Alembert, Abbé Bossut, de la Lande, Marquis de Condorcet, Charles, etc. (1789). Encyclopedie Methodique ou Par Ordre de Matieres: Mathematiques. Paris: Panckoucke.
 Lacombe, Jacques (1792). Dictionnaire des Jeux. Panckoucke, Paris.

 External links 
 Le Naine jaune at the Académie des jeux oubliés''. 1760 rules.
 Règle du nain jaune at www.lecomptoirdesjeux.com.
 How to Play Nain Jaune at www.catsatcards.com.

French card games
18th-century card games
Multi-player card games
Stops group